William Ormsby-Gore may refer to:

William Ormsby-Gore (1779–1860), MP for  County Leitrim, Caernarvon and North Shropshire
William Ormsby-Gore, 2nd Baron Harlech (1819–1904), MP for Sligo in the British Parliament (1841–1852)
William Ormsby-Gore, 4th Baron Harlech (1885–1964), British MP and Cabinet Minister

See also
William Gore (disambiguation)